Anavoor  is a village in Thiruvananthapuram district in the state of Kerala, India.

Demographics
 India census, Anavoor had a population of 14618 with 7224 males and 7394 females.
Anavoor village-kunnathukal panchayath-neyyattinkara taluk-trivandrum district. Ghss Anavoor is the popular school.  Agriculture is the main occupation of the people.

References

Remani P Nair is the District Panchayath President. Not Anaavoor Nagappan

Villages in Thiruvananthapuram district